Farrancallin is a townland in County Westmeath, Ireland.

Farrancallin is one of 11 townlands of the civil parish of Taghmon in the barony of Corkaree in the Province of Leinster.

The neighbouring townlands are: Taghmon to the north and east, Monkstown to the south–east, Sheefin to the south–west and Martinstown to the west.

In the 1911 census of Ireland there were 7 houses and 24 inhabitants in the townland.

References

External links
Map of Farrancallin at openstreetmap.org
Farrancallin at the IreAtlas Townland Data Base
Farrancallin at Townlands.ie
Farrancallin at The Placenames Database of Ireland

Townlands of County Westmeath